The 2011–12 LEB Oro season is the 16th season of the Liga Española de Baloncesto. It's named too Adecco Oro by sponsorship reasons. The 306-game regular season (34 games for each of the 18 teams) will begin on Friday, September 23, 2010, and will end on Friday, April 27, 2011. The champion of the regular season will be promoted to Liga ACB. The teams between 2nd and 9th position will play a best of 5 games play off, where the winner will be promoted too to the higher division. The teams 16th and 17th will play a best of 5 games play-out where the loser will be relegated to LEB Plata, with the 18th team.

Competition format

Eligibility of players
All teams must have in their roster:
A minimum of six players who played in Spain during three season being between 15 and 20 years old.
A maximum of two non-EU players. This players can be replaced by players from the EU or ACP countries.
A maximum of three players from the EU or ACP countries.

Teams can not sign any player after February 29, 2012.

Regular season
Each team of every division has to play with all the other teams of its division twice, once at home and the other at the opponent's stadium. This means that in Liga LEB the league ends after every team plays 34 games. The first round will be played on September 23, 2011 and the last one on April 27, 2012.

Like many other leagues in continental Europe, the Liga LEB takes a winter break once each team has played half its schedule. One feature of the league that may be unusual to North American observers is that the two halves of the season are played in the same order—that is, the order of each team's first-half fixtures is repeated in the second half of the season, with the only difference being the arenas used. This procedure is typical in Europe; it is also used by La Liga in football.

Since the 18th round, if two or more teams have accumulated the same number of winning games, the criteria of tie-breaking are these:
Head-to-head winning games.
Head-to-head points coefficient.
Total points coefficient.

After the first half of the season (17th round), the two top qualified teams will play the Copa Príncipe de Asturias and the leader will be the host team. This game will be on February 1, 2012.

At the final of the season:
The regular season winner promotes directly to Liga ACB.
Teams qualified between 2nd and 9th, will join the promotion play-offs to ACB.
Teams qualified in 16th and 17th will play a relegation play-out to LEB Plata.
Team qualified in 18th position is relegated directly to LEB Plata.

Team information 
CB Granada and Menorca Bàsquet were directly relegated from ACB after finishing in the bottom two places and they will substitute CB Murcia (champion) and Blu:sens Monbús.

Aguas de Sousas Ourense and Fundación Adepal Alcázar, who lost the relegation playoffs against Palencia Baloncesto, left the league after finishing in 17th and 18th position. Knet Rioja as champion of LEB Plata and Iberostar Bàsquet Mallorca as LEB Plata playoffs winner will enjoy the league.

On August 1, and when the registration date expired days ago, CB Tarragona announced would resign to their berth in LEB Oro and would try to join the group C of Liga EBA, but finally the Catalan team will compete at this league.

All rosters for the start of the season at FEB.es

Managerial changes

Before the start of the season

During the season

Regular season

League table
{| class="wikitable" style="text-align: center;"
! width=20| # !! Teams !! width=20|P !! width=20|W !! width=20|L !! width=35|PF !! width=35|PA !! width=20|PT !! Qualification or relegation
|- bgcolor=ACE1AF
|1||align="left"|Iberostar Canarias (C) || 34 || 26 || 8 || 2993 || 2596 || 60 || align="center"|Promotion to ACB
|- bgcolor=D0F0C0
|2||align="left"|Ford Burgos || 34 || 22 || 12 || 2690 || 2359 || 56 || rowspan=8 align="center"| Promotion playoffs
|- bgcolor=D0F0C0
|3||align="left"|Grupo Iruña Navarra || 34 || 21 || 13 || 2689 || 2596 || 55
|- bgcolor=D0F0C0
|4||align="left"|Menorca Bàsquet || 34 || 21 || 13 || 2602 || 2442 || 55
|- bgcolor=D0F0C0
|5||align="left"|Club Melilla Baloncesto || 34 || 20 || 14 || 2730 || 2677 || 54
|- bgcolor=D0F0C0
|6||align="left"|Lleida Basquetbol || 34 || 20 || 14 || 2518 || 2510 || 54
|- bgcolor=D0F0C0
|7||align="left"|CB Breogán || 34 || 19 || 15 || 2658 || 2577 || 53
|- bgcolor=D0F0C0
|8||align="left"|UB La Palma, la Isla Bonita || 34 || 19 || 15 || 2558 || 2546 || 53
|- bgcolor=D0F0C0
|9||align="left"|Cáceres Patrimonio de la Humanidad || 34 || 18 || 16 || 2719 || 2679 || 52
|-
|10||align="left"|Knet & Éniac || 34 || 18 || 16 || 2708 || 2709 || 52
|-
|11||align="left"|Palencia Baloncesto || 34 || 18 || 16 || 2705 || 2651 || 52
|-
|12||align="left"|Girona FC || 34 || 16 || 18 || 2549 || 2620 || 50
|-
|13||align="left"|Logitravel Mallorca Bàsquet || 34 || 15 || 19 || 2768 || 2822 || 49
|-
|14||align="left"|Baloncesto León|| 34 || 15 || 19 || 2671 || 2711 || 49
|-
|15||align="left"|Lobe Huesca || 34 || 13 || 21 || 2622 || 2663 || 47
|- bgcolor=FFE6E6
|16||align="left"|Tarragona Bàsquet 2017 || 34 || 11 || 23 || 2490 || 2662 || 45 || rowspan=2 align="center"| Relegation playoffs
|- bgcolor=FFE6E6
|17||align="left"|Clínicas Rincón Benahavís || 34 || 7 || 27 || 2124 || 2495 || 41
|- bgcolor=FFCCCC
|18||align="left"|CB Granada || 34 || 7 || 27 || 2415 || 2714 || 41 || Relegation to LEB Plata
|-

(C) = Copa Príncipe de Asturias champion

Positions by round
{|class="wikitable sortable" style="text-align: center;"{|class="wikitable sortable" style="text-align: center;"
! Team\Round !! !! !! !! !! !! !! !! !! !! !! !! !! !! !! !! !! !! !! !! !! !! !! !! !! !! !! !! !! !! !! !! !! !!
|-
! !! 01 !! 02 !! 03 !! 04 !! 05 !! 06 !! 07 !! 08 !! 09 !! 10 !! 11 !! 12 !! 13 !! 14 !! 15 !! 16 !! 17 !! 18 !! 19 !! 20 !! 21 !! 22 !! 23 !! 24 !! 25 !! 26 !! 27 !! 28 !! 29 !! 30 !! 31 !! 32 !! 33 !! 34
|-
|align="left"|Iberostar Canarias ||12 ||bgcolor=#D0F0C0|6 ||bgcolor=#D0F0C0|2 ||bgcolor=#D0F0C0|2 ||bgcolor=#D0F0C0|2 ||bgcolor=#D0F0C0|2 ||bgcolor=#ACE1AF|1 ||bgcolor=#ACE1AF|1 ||bgcolor=#ACE1AF|1 ||bgcolor=#ACE1AF|1 ||bgcolor=#ACE1AF|1 ||bgcolor=#ACE1AF|1 ||bgcolor=#ACE1AF|1 ||bgcolor=#ACE1AF|1 ||bgcolor=#ACE1AF|1 ||bgcolor=#ACE1AF|1 ||bgcolor=#ACE1AF|1 ||bgcolor=#ACE1AF|1 ||bgcolor=#ACE1AF|1 ||bgcolor=#ACE1AF|1 ||bgcolor=#ACE1AF|1 ||bgcolor=#ACE1AF|1 ||bgcolor=#ACE1AF|1 ||bgcolor=#ACE1AF|1 ||bgcolor=#ACE1AF|1 ||bgcolor=#ACE1AF|1 ||bgcolor=#ACE1AF|1 ||bgcolor=#ACE1AF|1 ||bgcolor=#ACE1AF|1 ||bgcolor=#ACE1AF|1 ||bgcolor=#ACE1AF|1 ||bgcolor=#ACE1AF|1 ||bgcolor=#ACE1AF|1 ||bgcolor=#ACE1AF|1
|-
|align="left"|Ford Burgos ||bgcolor=#D0F0C0|2 ||bgcolor=#D0F0C0|7 ||bgcolor=#D0F0C0|3 ||bgcolor=#D0F0C0|3 ||bgcolor=#D0F0C0|3 ||bgcolor=#D0F0C0|3 ||bgcolor=#D0F0C0|2 ||bgcolor=#D0F0C0|3 ||bgcolor=#D0F0C0|3 ||bgcolor=#D0F0C0|4 ||bgcolor=#D0F0C0|3 ||bgcolor=#D0F0C0|3 ||bgcolor=#D0F0C0|3 ||bgcolor=#D0F0C0|2 ||bgcolor=#D0F0C0|2 ||bgcolor=#D0F0C0|2 ||bgcolor=#D0F0C0|2 ||bgcolor=#D0F0C0|2 ||bgcolor=#D0F0C0|2 ||bgcolor=#D0F0C0|3 ||bgcolor=#D0F0C0|4 ||bgcolor=#D0F0C0|4 ||bgcolor=#D0F0C0|7 ||bgcolor=#D0F0C0|5 ||bgcolor=#D0F0C0|7 ||bgcolor=#D0F0C0|6 ||bgcolor=#D0F0C0|5 ||bgcolor=#D0F0C0|5 ||bgcolor=#D0F0C0|4 ||bgcolor=#D0F0C0|3 ||bgcolor=#D0F0C0|2 ||bgcolor=#D0F0C0|2 ||bgcolor=#D0F0C0|2 ||bgcolor=#D0F0C0|2
|-
|align="left"|Grupo Iruña Navarra ||bgcolor=#D0F0C0|7 ||12 ||14 ||bgcolor=#FFE6E6|17 ||12 ||13 ||13 ||bgcolor=#FFE6E6|16 ||15 ||12 ||10 ||10 ||bgcolor=#D0F0C0|7 ||bgcolor=#D0F0C0|5 ||bgcolor=#D0F0C0|7 ||bgcolor=#D0F0C0|7 ||bgcolor=#D0F0C0|6 ||bgcolor=#D0F0C0|7 ||bgcolor=#D0F0C0|4 ||bgcolor=#D0F0C0|7 ||bgcolor=#D0F0C0|7 ||bgcolor=#D0F0C0|7 ||bgcolor=#D0F0C0|6 ||bgcolor=#D0F0C0|4 ||bgcolor=#D0F0C0|6 ||bgcolor=#D0F0C0|5 ||bgcolor=#D0F0C0|6 ||bgcolor=#D0F0C0|6 ||bgcolor=#D0F0C0|6 ||bgcolor=#D0F0C0|6 ||bgcolor=#D0F0C0|6 ||bgcolor=#D0F0C0|4 ||bgcolor=#D0F0C0|5 ||bgcolor=#D0F0C0|3
|-
|align="left"|Menorca Bàsquet ||10 ||bgcolor=#D0F0C0|5 ||12 ||bgcolor=#D0F0C0|6 ||bgcolor=#D0F0C0|9 ||bgcolor=#D0F0C0|6 ||bgcolor=#D0F0C0|8 ||bgcolor=#D0F0C0|8 ||bgcolor=#D0F0C0|6 ||bgcolor=#D0F0C0|5 ||bgcolor=#D0F0C0|7 ||bgcolor=#D0F0C0|4 ||bgcolor=#D0F0C0|4 ||bgcolor=#D0F0C0|4 ||bgcolor=#D0F0C0|4 ||bgcolor=#D0F0C0|3 ||bgcolor=#D0F0C0|4 ||bgcolor=#D0F0C0|4 ||bgcolor=#D0F0C0|5 ||bgcolor=#D0F0C0|2 ||bgcolor=#D0F0C0|2 ||bgcolor=#D0F0C0|2 ||bgcolor=#D0F0C0|3 ||bgcolor=#D0F0C0|2 ||bgcolor=#D0F0C0|2 ||bgcolor=#D0F0C0|2 ||bgcolor=#D0F0C0|2 ||bgcolor=#D0F0C0|3 ||bgcolor=#D0F0C0|2 ||bgcolor=#D0F0C0|2 ||bgcolor=#D0F0C0|3 ||bgcolor=#D0F0C0|5 ||bgcolor=#D0F0C0|3 ||bgcolor=#D0F0C0|4
|-
|align="left"|Club Melilla Baloncesto ||bgcolor=#D0F0C0|4 ||bgcolor=#D0F0C0|8 ||bgcolor=#D0F0C0|5 ||11 ||bgcolor=#D0F0C0|8 ||bgcolor=#D0F0C0|5 ||bgcolor=#D0F0C0|5 ||bgcolor=#D0F0C0|7 ||bgcolor=#D0F0C0|5 ||bgcolor=#D0F0C0|8 ||bgcolor=#D0F0C0|5 ||bgcolor=#D0F0C0|7 ||bgcolor=#D0F0C0|5 ||bgcolor=#D0F0C0|7 ||bgcolor=#D0F0C0|6 ||bgcolor=#D0F0C0|5 ||bgcolor=#D0F0C0|5 ||bgcolor=#D0F0C0|5 ||bgcolor=#D0F0C0|6 ||bgcolor=#D0F0C0|5 ||bgcolor=#D0F0C0|5 ||bgcolor=#D0F0C0|6 ||bgcolor=#D0F0C0|5 ||bgcolor=#D0F0C0|6 ||bgcolor=#D0F0C0|4 ||bgcolor=#D0F0C0|7 ||bgcolor=#D0F0C0|7 ||bgcolor=#D0F0C0|7 ||bgcolor=#D0F0C0|7 ||bgcolor=#D0F0C0|7 ||bgcolor=#D0F0C0|7 ||bgcolor=#D0F0C0|7 ||bgcolor=#D0F0C0|7 ||bgcolor=#D0F0C0|5
|-
|align="left"|Lleida Basquetbol ||bgcolor=#D0F0C0|6 ||bgcolor=#D0F0C0|3 ||bgcolor=#ACE1AF|1 ||bgcolor=#ACE1AF|1 ||bgcolor=#ACE1AF|1 ||bgcolor=#ACE1AF|1 ||bgcolor=#D0F0C0|4 ||bgcolor=#D0F0C0|2 ||bgcolor=#D0F0C0|2 ||bgcolor=#D0F0C0|2 ||bgcolor=#D0F0C0|2 ||bgcolor=#D0F0C0|2 ||bgcolor=#D0F0C0|2 ||bgcolor=#D0F0C0|3 ||bgcolor=#D0F0C0|3 ||bgcolor=#D0F0C0|6 ||bgcolor=#D0F0C0|7 ||bgcolor=#D0F0C0|6 ||bgcolor=#D0F0C0|7 ||bgcolor=#D0F0C0|6 ||bgcolor=#D0F0C0|6 ||bgcolor=#D0F0C0|5 ||bgcolor=#D0F0C0|4 ||bgcolor=#D0F0C0|7 ||bgcolor=#D0F0C0|5 ||bgcolor=#D0F0C0|4 ||bgcolor=#D0F0C0|4 ||bgcolor=#D0F0C0|4 ||bgcolor=#D0F0C0|5 ||bgcolor=#D0F0C0|5 ||bgcolor=#D0F0C0|5 ||bgcolor=#D0F0C0|3 ||bgcolor=#D0F0C0|4 ||bgcolor=#D0F0C0|6
|-
|align="left"|CB Breogán ||bgcolor=#D0F0C0|9 ||14 ||11 ||12 ||bgcolor=#D0F0C0|6 ||bgcolor=#D0F0C0|9 ||bgcolor=#D0F0C0|6 ||bgcolor=#D0F0C0|5 ||bgcolor=#D0F0C0|7 ||bgcolor=#D0F0C0|6 ||bgcolor=#D0F0C0|6 ||bgcolor=#D0F0C0|8 ||bgcolor=#D0F0C0|9 ||12 ||bgcolor=#D0F0C0|9 ||bgcolor=#D0F0C0|8 ||bgcolor=#D0F0C0|9 ||11 ||15 ||15 ||14 ||14 ||13 ||13 ||13 ||11 ||10 ||bgcolor=#D0F0C0|8 ||bgcolor=#D0F0C0|8 ||bgcolor=#D0F0C0|8 ||bgcolor=#D0F0C0|8 ||bgcolor=#D0F0C0|8 ||bgcolor=#D0F0C0|8 ||bgcolor=#D0F0C0|7
|-
|align="left"|UB La Palma, la Isla Bonita ||bgcolor=#D0F0C0|8 ||bgcolor=#D0F0C0|4 ||10 ||bgcolor=#D0F0C0|4 ||bgcolor=#D0F0C0|4 ||bgcolor=#D0F0C0|4 ||bgcolor=#D0F0C0|3 ||bgcolor=#D0F0C0|4 ||bgcolor=#D0F0C0|4 ||bgcolor=#D0F0C0|3 ||bgcolor=#D0F0C0|4 ||bgcolor=#D0F0C0|5 ||bgcolor=#D0F0C0|8 ||bgcolor=#D0F0C0|6 ||bgcolor=#D0F0C0|5 ||bgcolor=#D0F0C0|4 ||bgcolor=#D0F0C0|3 ||bgcolor=#D0F0C0|3 ||bgcolor=#D0F0C0|3 ||bgcolor=#D0F0C0|4 ||bgcolor=#D0F0C0|3 ||bgcolor=#D0F0C0|3 ||bgcolor=#D0F0C0|2 ||bgcolor=#D0F0C0|3 ||bgcolor=#D0F0C0|3 ||bgcolor=#D0F0C0|3 ||bgcolor=#D0F0C0|3 ||bgcolor=#D0F0C0|2 ||bgcolor=#D0F0C0|3 ||bgcolor=#D0F0C0|4 ||bgcolor=#D0F0C0|4 ||bgcolor=#D0F0C0|6 ||bgcolor=#D0F0C0|6 ||bgcolor=#D0F0C0|8
|-
|align="left"|Cáceres Patrimonio de la Humanidad ||bgcolor=#FFE6E6|16 ||10 ||bgcolor=#D0F0C0|9 ||bgcolor=#D0F0C0|9 ||13 ||bgcolor=#FFE6E6|16 ||bgcolor=#FFE6E6|16 ||14 ||13 ||bgcolor=#FFE6E6|16 ||13 ||12 ||13 ||11 ||12 ||10 ||12 ||bgcolor=#D0F0C0|8 ||bgcolor=#D0F0C0|9 ||12 ||10 ||12 ||11 ||12 ||12 ||12 ||11 ||12 ||11 ||12 ||10 ||10 ||10 ||bgcolor=#D0F0C0|9
|-
|align="left"|Knet & Éniac ||bgcolor=#ACE1AF|1 ||bgcolor=#ACE1AF|1 ||bgcolor=#D0F0C0|4 ||bgcolor=#D0F0C0|7 ||11 ||12 ||10 ||10 ||14 ||bgcolor=#FFE6E6|17 ||bgcolor=#FFE6E6|17 ||14 ||14 ||15 ||bgcolor=#FFE6E6|16 ||15 ||14 ||15 ||14 ||11 ||13 ||11 ||12 ||11 ||bgcolor=#D0F0C0|9 ||bgcolor=#D0F0C0|9 ||bgcolor=#D0F0C0|8 ||bgcolor=#D0F0C0|9 ||bgcolor=#D0F0C0|9 ||bgcolor=#D0F0C0|9 ||bgcolor=#D0F0C0|9 ||bgcolor=#D0F0C0|9 ||bgcolor=#D0F0C0|9 ||10
|-
|align="left"|Palencia Baloncesto ||15 ||13 ||15 ||10 ||14 ||bgcolor=#D0F0C0|8 ||bgcolor=#D0F0C0|7 ||bgcolor=#D0F0C0|6 ||bgcolor=#D0F0C0|8 ||bgcolor=#D0F0C0|7 ||bgcolor=#D0F0C0|8 ||bgcolor=#D0F0C0|6 ||bgcolor=#D0F0C0|6 ||bgcolor=#D0F0C0|8 ||10 ||11 ||10 ||13 ||13 ||10 ||11 ||10 ||10 ||10 ||11 ||bgcolor=#D0F0C0|8 ||12 ||10 ||10 ||10 ||11 ||11 ||11 ||11
|-
|align="left"|Girona FC ||bgcolor=#D0F0C0|3 ||bgcolor=#D0F0C0|2 ||bgcolor=#D0F0C0|7 ||bgcolor=#D0F0C0|8 ||bgcolor=#D0F0C0|5 ||bgcolor=#D0F0C0|7 ||11 ||12 ||11 ||13 ||11 ||13 ||11 ||bgcolor=#D0F0C0|9 ||bgcolor=#D0F0C0|8 ||bgcolor=#D0F0C0|9 ||bgcolor=#D0F0C0|8 ||bgcolor=#D0F0C0|9 ||bgcolor=#D0F0C0|8 ||bgcolor=#D0F0C0|8 ||bgcolor=#D0F0C0|8 ||bgcolor=#D0F0C0|8 ||bgcolor=#D0F0C0|8 ||bgcolor=#D0F0C0|8 ||bgcolor=#D0F0C0|8 ||10 ||bgcolor=#D0F0C0|9 ||11 ||12 ||11 ||12 ||12 ||12 ||12
|-
|align="left"|Logitravel Mallorca Básquet ||14 ||bgcolor=#D0F0C0|9 ||bgcolor=#D0F0C0|8 ||13 ||15 ||bgcolor=#FFE6E6|17 ||bgcolor=#FFE6E6|17 ||15 ||12 ||15 ||12 ||11 ||12 ||10 ||11 ||13 ||11 ||10 ||10 ||13 ||12 ||13 ||14 ||14 ||14 ||14 ||13 ||13 ||13 ||14 ||13 ||14 ||14 ||13
|-
|align="left"|Baloncesto León ||bgcolor=#FFCCCC|18 ||bgcolor=#FFE6E6|17 ||bgcolor=#FFE6E6|17 ||15 ||10 ||11 ||bgcolor=#D0F0C0|9 ||bgcolor=#D0F0C0|9 ||bgcolor=#D0F0C0|9 ||bgcolor=#D0F0C0|9 ||bgcolor=#D0F0C0|9 ||bgcolor=#D0F0C0|9 ||10 ||13 ||13 ||12 ||13 ||12 ||11 ||bgcolor=#D0F0C0|9 ||bgcolor=#D0F0C0|9 ||bgcolor=#D0F0C0|9 ||bgcolor=#D0F0C0|9 ||bgcolor=#D0F0C0|9 ||10 ||13 ||14 ||14 ||14 ||13 ||14 ||13 ||13 ||14
|-
|align="left"|Lobe Huesca ||13 ||bgcolor=#FFE6E6|16 ||bgcolor=#FFE6E6|16 ||bgcolor=#FFE6E6|16 ||bgcolor=#FFE6E6|17 ||15 ||15 ||bgcolor=#FFE6E6|17 ||bgcolor=#FFE6E6|16 ||11 ||14 ||bgcolor=#FFE6E6|17 ||15 ||bgcolor=#FFE6E6|16 ||14 ||14 ||15 ||14 ||12 ||14 ||bgcolor=#FFE6E6|16 ||bgcolor=#FFE6E6|16 ||bgcolor=#FFE6E6|16 ||bgcolor=#FFE6E6|16 ||bgcolor=#FFE6E6|16 ||bgcolor=#FFE6E6|16 ||bgcolor=#FFE6E6|16 ||bgcolor=#FFE6E6|16 ||bgcolor=#FFE6E6|16 ||bgcolor=#FFE6E6|16 ||bgcolor=#FFE6E6|16 ||15 ||15 ||15
|-
|align="left"|Tarragona Bàsquet 2017 ||11 ||15 ||13 ||14 ||bgcolor=#FFE6E6|16 ||14 ||14 ||13 ||bgcolor=#FFE6E6|17 ||14 ||bgcolor=#FFE6E6|16 ||15 ||bgcolor=#FFE6E6|16 ||14 ||15 ||bgcolor=#FFE6E6|16 ||bgcolor=#FFE6E6|16 ||bgcolor=#FFE6E6|16 ||bgcolor=#FFE6E6|16 ||bgcolor=#FFE6E6|16 ||15 ||15 ||15 ||15 ||15 ||15 ||15 ||15 ||15 ||15 ||15 ||bgcolor=#FFE6E6|16 ||bgcolor=#FFE6E6|16 ||bgcolor=#FFE6E6|16
|-
|align="left"|Clínicas Rincón Benahavís ||bgcolor=#FFE6E6|17 ||bgcolor=#FFCCCC|18 ||bgcolor=#FFCCCC|18 ||bgcolor=#FFCCCC|18 ||bgcolor=#FFCCCC|18 ||bgcolor=#FFCCCC|18 ||bgcolor=#FFCCCC|18 ||bgcolor=#FFCCCC|18 ||bgcolor=#FFCCCC|18 ||bgcolor=#FFCCCC|18 ||bgcolor=#FFCCCC|18 ||bgcolor=#FFCCCC|18 ||bgcolor=#FFCCCC|18 ||bgcolor=#FFCCCC|18 ||bgcolor=#FFCCCC|18 ||bgcolor=#FFCCCC|18 ||bgcolor=#FFCCCC|18 ||bgcolor=#FFCCCC|18 ||bgcolor=#FFCCCC|18 ||bgcolor=#FFCCCC|18 ||bgcolor=#FFCCCC|18 ||bgcolor=#FFCCCC|18 ||bgcolor=#FFCCCC|18 ||bgcolor=#FFCCCC|18 ||bgcolor=#FFCCCC|18 ||bgcolor=#FFCCCC|18 ||bgcolor=#FFCCCC|18 ||bgcolor=#FFCCCC|18 ||bgcolor=#FFCCCC|18 ||bgcolor=#FFCCCC|18 ||bgcolor=#FFCCCC|18 ||bgcolor=#FFCCCC|18 ||bgcolor=#FFCCCC|18 ||bgcolor=#FFE6E6|17
|-
|align="left"|CB Granada ||bgcolor=#D0F0C0|5 ||11 ||bgcolor=#D0F0C0|6 ||bgcolor=#D0F0C0|5 ||bgcolor=#D0F0C0|7 ||10 ||12 ||11 ||10 ||10 ||15 ||bgcolor=#FFE6E6|16 ||bgcolor=#FFE6E6|17 ||bgcolor=#FFE6E6|17 ||bgcolor=#FFE6E6|17 ||bgcolor=#FFE6E6|17 ||bgcolor=#FFE6E6|17 ||bgcolor=#FFE6E6|17 ||bgcolor=#FFE6E6|17 ||bgcolor=#FFE6E6|17 ||bgcolor=#FFE6E6|17 ||bgcolor=#FFE6E6|17 ||bgcolor=#FFE6E6|17 ||bgcolor=#FFE6E6|17 ||bgcolor=#FFE6E6|17 ||bgcolor=#FFE6E6|17 ||bgcolor=#FFE6E6|17 ||bgcolor=#FFE6E6|17 ||bgcolor=#FFE6E6|17 ||bgcolor=#FFE6E6|17 ||bgcolor=#FFE6E6|17 ||bgcolor=#FFE6E6|17 ||bgcolor=#FFE6E6|17 ||bgcolor=#FFCCCC|18
|-

Results
{| style="font-size: 85%; text-align: center" class="wikitable"
|-
|
| align="center" width=45|León
| width=45|Cáceres
| width=45|Breogán
| width=45|Granada
| width=45|Clínicas
| width=45|Melilla
| width=45|Burgos
| width=45|Girona
| width=45|Navarra
| width=45|Canarias
| width=45|Knet
| width=45|Lleida
| width=45|Huesca
| width=45|Mallorca
| width=45|Menorca
| width=45|Palencia
| width=45|Tarrag
| width=45|LaPalma
|-
|align=left|Baloncesto León
| style="background:#ccc;"|
| style="background:#dfd;"|95–90
| style="background:#fdd;"|70–76
| style="background:#dfd;"|77–59
| style="background:#fdd;"|65–76
| style="background:#dfd;"|91–70
| style="background:#dfd;"|75–71
| style="background:#fdd;"|82–88
| style="background:#fdd;"|89–94
| style="background:#fdd;"|74–82
| style="background:#dfd;"|80–72
| style="background:#fdd;"|74–76
| style="background:#dfd;"|86–82
| style="background:#dfd;"|95–100
| style="background:#dfd;"|94–79
| style="background:#dfd;"|88–87
| style="background:#fdd;"|69–77
| style="background:#dfd;"|80–79
|-
|align=left|Cáceres Patrimonio de la Humanidad
| style="background:#dfd;"|83–78
| style="background:#ccc;"|
| style="background:#dfd;"|78–64
| style="background:#dfd;"|78–75
| style="background:#fdd;"|74–81
| style="background:#dfd;"|85–72
| style="background:#fdd;"|68–77
| style="background:#dfd;"|93–75
| style="background:#fdd;"|75–84
| style="background:#fdd;"|80–97
| style="background:#fdd;"|85–86
| style="background:#dfd;"|88–86
| style="background:#dfd;"|71–64
| style="background:#dfd;"|102–82
| style="background:#dfd;"|80–72
| style="background:#dfd;"|93–76
| style="background:#dfd;"|71–59
| style="background:#dfd;"|90–78
|-
|align=left|CB Breogán
| style="background:#fdd;"|74–94
| style="background:#fdd;"|79–81
| style="background:#ccc;"|
| style="background:#dfd;"|64–63
| style="background:#dfd;"|82–73
| style="background:#dfd;"|71–67
| style="background:#dfd;"|80–71
| style="background:#dfd;"|69–64
| style="background:#dfd;"|78–71
| style="background:#fdd;"|82–93
| style="background:#fdd;"|84–88
| style="background:#dfd;"|81–61
| style="background:#dfd;"|86–75
| style="background:#dfd;"|80–75
| style="background:#dfd;"|87–86
| style="background:#dfd;"|76–66
| style="background:#dfd;"|93–63
| style="background:#dfd;"|74–67
|-
|align=left|CB Granada
| style="background:#fdd;"|74–76
| style="background:#dfd;"|96–92
| style="background:#fdd;"|63–80
| style="background:#ccc;"|
| style="background:#fdd;"|60–70
| style="background:#fdd;"|73–75
| style="background:#fdd;"|65–73
| style="background:#fdd;"|50–68
| style="background:#dfd;"|80–67
| style="background:#dfd;"|90–89
| style="background:#fdd;"|76–85
| style="background:#fdd;"|57–71
| style="background:#fdd;"|64–84
| style="background:#dfd;"|103–94
| style="background:#fdd;"|57–78
| style="background:#fdd;"|56–90
| style="background:#dfd;"|79–69
| style="background:#fdd;"|58–65
|-
|align=left|Clínicas Rincón Benahavís
| style="background:#fdd;"|76–81
| style="background:#fdd;"|62–67
| style="background:#fdd;"|45–72
| style="background:#dfd;"|71–61
| style="background:#ccc;"|
| style="background:#dfd;"|67–64
| style="background:#fdd;"|63–78
| style="background:#fdd;"|58–69
| style="background:#fdd;"|67–68
| style="background:#fdd;"|47–99
| style="background:#fdd;"|59–82
| style="background:#fdd;"|57–69
| style="background:#dfd;"|83–63
| style="background:#fdd;"|67–71
| style="background:#fdd;"|46–64
| style="background:#dfd;"|72–62
| style="background:#fdd;"|63–69
| style="background:#fdd;"|58–67
|-
|align=left|Club Melilla Baloncesto
| style="background:#fdd;"|78–83
| style="background:#dfd;"|85–83
| style="background:#dfd;"|99–94
| style="background:#dfd;"|78–71
| style="background:#dfd;"|80–69
| style="background:#ccc;"|
| style="background:#dfd;"|88–84
| style="background:#dfd;"|98–70
| style="background:#dfd;"|95–78
| style="background:#dfd;"|77–63
| style="background:#dfd;"|107–90
| style="background:#dfd;"|86–80
| style="background:#dfd;"|88–78
| style="background:#dfd;"|89–78
| style="background:#fdd;"|72–78
| style="background:#dfd;"|94–79
| style="background:#dfd;"|77–74
| style="background:#dfd;"|72–70
|-
|align=left|Ford Burgos
| style="background:#dfd;"|75–73
| style="background:#dfd;"|85–75
| style="background:#dfd;"|86–73
| style="background:#dfd;"|89–76
| style="background:#dfd;"|78–55
| style="background:#dfd;"|93–91
| style="background:#ccc;"|
| style="background:#dfd;"|83–78
| style="background:#dfd;"|67–64
| style="background:#dfd;"|81–76
| style="background:#fdd;"|68–75
| style="background:#dfd;"|88–53
| style="background:#dfd;"|93–90
| style="background:#fdd;"|83–87
| style="background:#fdd;"|64–65
| style="background:#dfd;"|73–62
| style="background:#dfd;"|90–62
| style="background:#dfd;"|97–85
|-
|align=left|Girona FC
| style="background:#dfd;"|81–77
| style="background:#dfd;"|87–72
| style="background:#dfd;"|84–78
| style="background:#fdd;"|59–73
| style="background:#dfd;"|75–59
| style="background:#dfd;"|78–76
| style="background:#dfd;"|81–77
| style="background:#ccc;"|
| style="background:#fdd;"|67–69
| style="background:#fdd;"|83–88
| style="background:#fdd;"|85–90
| style="background:#fdd;"|81–85
| style="background:#dfd;"|73–65
| style="background:#dfd;"|88–83
| style="background:#dfd;"|72–62
| style="background:#dfd;"|101–95
| style="background:#dfd;"|88–86
| style="background:#fdd;"|66–75
|-
|align=left|Grupo Iruña Navarra
| style="background:#dfd;"|72–60
| style="background:#dfd;"|84–76
| style="background:#fdd;"|93–103
| style="background:#dfd;"|104–90
| style="background:#dfd;"|75–53
| style="background:#dfd;"|83–75
| style="background:#dfd;"|69–67
| style="background:#dfd;"|90–82
| style="background:#ccc;"|
| style="background:#dfd;"|85–82
| style="background:#fdd;"|80–81
| style="background:#fdd;"|68–74
| style="background:#dfd;"|88–74
| style="background:#dfd;"|87–82
| style="background:#dfd;"|89–79
| style="background:#fdd;"|83–88
| style="background:#dfd;"|85–75
| style="background:#dfd;"|88–82
|-
|align=left|Iberostar Canarias
| style="background:#dfd;"|103–76
| style="background:#dfd;"|80–71
| style="background:#dfd;"|89–73
| style="background:#dfd;"|88–77
| style="background:#dfd;"|75–64
| style="background:#dfd;"|91–70
| style="background:#dfd;"|90–69
| style="background:#dfd;"|80–69
| style="background:#fdd;"|55–67
| style="background:#ccc;"|
| style="background:#fdd;"|81–83
| style="background:#dfd;"|91–77
| style="background:#dfd;"|92–55
| style="background:#dfd;"|107–79
| style="background:#dfd;"|83–77
| style="background:#dfd;"|88–83
| style="background:#dfd;"|74–67
| style="background:#dfd;"|107–76
|-
|align=left|Knet & Éniac
| style="background:#dfd;"|93–73
| style="background:#fdd;"|76–94
| style="background:#fdd;"|79–86
| style="background:#dfd;"|86–67
| style="background:#dfd;"|78–66
| style="background:#dfd;"|80–76
| style="background:#fdd;"|76–90
| style="background:#dfd;"|77–67
| style="background:#fdd;"|65–79
| style="background:#fdd;"|86–104
| style="background:#ccc;"|
| style="background:#dfd;"|76–74
| style="background:#fdd;"|98–101
| style="background:#fdd;"|76–80
| style="background:#fdd;"|67–78
| style="background:#dfd;"|96–82
| style="background:#dfd;"|81–68
| style="background:#fdd;"|58–70
|-
|align=left|Lleida Basquetbol
| style="background:#dfd;"|89–80
| style="background:#dfd;"|69–65
| style="background:#dfd;"|67–65
| style="background:#dfd;"|71–52
| style="background:#dfd;"|79–55
| style="background:#fdd;"|58–61
| style="background:#dfd;"|90–76
| style="background:#dfd;"|89–70
| style="background:#dfd;"|74–72
| style="background:#fdd;"|70–104
| style="background:#fdd;"|63–69
| style="background:#ccc;"|
| style="background:#dfd;"|90–82
| style="background:#dfd;"|88–81
| style="background:#dfd;"|84–75
| style="background:#fdd;"|85–92
| style="background:#dfd;"|75–70
| style="background:#dfd;"|58–54
|-
|align=left|Lobe Huesca
| style="background:#fdd;"|68–81
| style="background:#dfd;"|71–66
| style="background:#dfd;"|84–80
| style="background:#dfd;"|112–56
| style="background:#dfd;"|86–54
| style="background:#fdd;"|76–84
| style="background:#fdd;"|67–91
| style="background:#dfd;"|74–61
| style="background:#fdd;"|70–74
| style="background:#dfd;"|92–89
| style="background:#fdd;"|71–76
| style="background:#fdd;"|67–71
| style="background:#ccc;"|
| style="background:#fdd;"|75–78
| style="background:#dfd;"|68–65
| style="background:#dfd;"|91–82
| style="background:#dfd;"|84–77
| style="background:#dfd;"|71–49
|-
|align=left|Logitravel Mallorca
| style="background:#dfd;"|78–70
| style="background:#fdd;"|83–88
| style="background:#dfd;"|80–75
| style="background:#fdd;"|75–81
| style="background:#dfd;"|79–63
| style="background:#fdd;"|86–88
| style="background:#dfd;"|85–71
| style="background:#fdd;"|73–81
| style="background:#dfd;"|80–77
| style="background:#fdd;"|85–92
| style="background:#dfd;"|91–79
| style="background:#fdd;"|67–72
| style="background:#dfd;"|87–83
| style="background:#ccc;"|
| style="background:#dfd;"|100–91
| style="background:#fdd;"|86–96
| style="background:#dfd;"|81–67
| style="background:#fdd;"|74–76
|-
|align=left|Menorca Bàsquet
| style="background:#dfd;"|74–65
| style="background:#dfd;"|84–61
| style="background:#dfd;"|74–73
| style="background:#dfd;"|81–79
| style="background:#dfd;"|80–37
| style="background:#dfd;"|85–81
| style="background:#fdd;"|68–72
| style="background:#dfd;"|71–57
| style="background:#fdd;"|72–82
| style="background:#fdd;"|62–72
| style="background:#dfd;"|89–87
| style="background:#dfd;"|75–56
| style="background:#fdd;"|75–76
| style="background:#dfd;"|84–80
| style="background:#ccc;"|
| style="background:#dfd;"|83–74
| style="background:#dfd;"|89–61
| style="background:#dfd;"|75–65
|-
|align=left|Palencia Baloncesto
| style="background:#dfd;"|78–61
| style="background:#dfd;"|80–76
| style="background:#dfd;"|72–65
| style="background:#dfd;"|86–80
| style="background:#dfd;"|77–64
| style="background:#fdd;"|66–69
| style="background:#fdd;"|79–87
| style="background:#dfd;"|80–65
| style="background:#dfd;"|89–81
| style="background:#dfd;"|92–84
| style="background:#dfd;"|80–71
| style="background:#dfd;"|73–71
| style="background:#dfd;"|78–74
| style="background:#dfd;"|83–73
| style="background:#fdd;"|67–71
| style="background:#ccc;"|
| style="background:#dfd;"|87–66
| style="background:#fdd;"|64–67
|-
|align=left|Tarragona Bàsquet 2017
| style="background:#fdd;"|74–83
| style="background:#fdd;"|79–82
| style="background:#fdd;"|78–87
| style="background:#dfd;"|84–79
| style="background:#dfd;"|68–60
| style="background:#dfd;"|78–68
| style="background:#fdd;"|73–78
| style="background:#dfd;"|76–65
| style="background:#dfd;"|69–66
| style="background:#fdd;"|98–111
| style="background:#dfd;"|83–75
| style="background:#dfd;"|72–71
| style="background:#dfd;"|95–70
| style="background:#fdd;"|69–73
| style="background:#fdd;"|65–89
| style="background:#dfd;"|80–76
| style="background:#ccc;"|
| style="background:#fdd;"|70–71
|-
|align=left|UB La Palma, la Isla Bonita
| style="background:#dfd;"|82–76
| style="background:#fdd;"|78–85
| style="background:#dfd;"|78–74
| style="background:#dfd;"|85–76
| style="background:#dfd;"|79–64
| style="background:#dfd;"|93–80
| style="background:#dfd;"|82–65
| style="background:#fdd;"|67–71
| style="background:#dfd;"|81–73
| style="background:#fdd;"|79–94
| style="background:#dfd;"|72–70
| style="background:#dfd;"|86–72
| style="background:#dfd;"|82–79
| style="background:#dfd;"|96–82
| style="background:#fdd;"|69–72
| style="background:#fdd;"|81–84
| style="background:#dfd;"|72–69
| style="background:#ccc;"|
|-

Copa Príncipe de Asturias
At the half of the league, the two first teams in the table play the Copa Príncipe de Asturias at home of the winner of the first half season (17th round). If this team doesn't want to host the Copa Príncipe, the second qualified can do it. If nobody wants to host it, the Federation will propose a neutral venue.

The Champion of this Cup will play the play-offs as first qualified if it finishes the league between the 2nd and the 5th qualified. The Copa Príncipe will be played on January 31, 2012.

Teams qualified

The game

Playoffs

Promotion playoffs

Relegation playoffs
The loser of a best-of-five series will be relegated to LEB Plata.

Stats leaders in regular season
Players must play at least 17 games to appear in the rankings

Points

Rebounds

Assists

Performance Index Rating

Awards

MVP week by week

Playoffs

References

External links
LEB Oro page in the FEB website
Competition rules

 
LEB Oro seasons
LEB2
Spain
Second level Spanish basketball league seasons